Robert Lee Constable (born 1942) is an American computer scientist. He is a professor of computer science and first and former dean of the Faculty of Computing and Information Science at Cornell University. He is known for his work on connecting computer programs and mathematical proofs, especially the Nuprl system. Prior to Nuprl, he worked on the PL/CV formal system and verifier. Alonzo Church was supervising the junior thesis of Robert while he was studying in Princeton.  Constable received his PhD in 1968 under Stephen Kleene and has supervised over 40 students, including Edmund M. Clarke, Robert Harper, Kurt Mehlhorn,  Steven Muchnick, Pavel Naumov, and Ryan Stansifer. He is a Fellow of the Association for Computing Machinery.

Constable has been a director of the Marktoberdorf Summer School.

Selected publications
 R. L. Constable and M. J. O'Donnell. A Programming Logic, Winthrop, Cambridge, 1978.
 R. L. Constable, S. D. Johnson and C. D. Eichenlaub. An Introduction to the PL/CV2 Programming Logic. In Lecture Notes in Computer Science 135, Springer-Verlag, 1982
 PRL Group. Implementing Mathematics with the Nuprl Proof Development System. Prentice-Hall, Engelwood Cliffs, NJ, 1986.

References

External links
 Homepage at Department of Computing and Information Science, Cornell University
 

Living people
Place of birth missing (living people)
University of Wisconsin–Madison alumni
Cornell University faculty
American computer scientists
Fellows of the Association for Computing Machinery
1942 births